Kallehgan or Kalah Gan may refer to:
 Kallehgan, Kerman
 Kalah Gan, Sistan and Baluchestan
 Kalah Gan Rural District, in Sistan and Baluchestan Province